Australia hosted the 1982 Commonwealth Games in Brisbane from 30 September to 9 October 1982. It was Australia's second time hosting the Games and twelfth appearance at the Commonwealth Games, having competed at every Games since their inception in 1930.
Australia won medals in eleven of the eleven sports that it entered.

Medalists
The following Australian competitors won medals at the games.

| style="text-align:left; width:78%; vertical-align:top;"|

| width="22%" align="left" valign="top" |

Officials
General Manager - James Barry 
Manageress - Marjorie Nelson 
Assistant Managers - Will Hoffman, Sol Spitalnic 
Administrayive Officer - Bob Hemery 
Office Assistants - Jeanette Brown, Anne Marie Harrison 
Attache - Edward Thomson 
Medical - Team Doctors - Dr Christopher Gale, DR Anthony Millar, Physiotherapist - Thomas Dobson, Masseur - Michael Kewley
Section Officials - Archer Manager - Russell Barter, Achery Coach - Gordon Pawson ; Athletics Manager - Wendy Ey, Assistant Managers - William Kitt, Margaret Mahoney, Coaches - Anthony Rice, Jean Roberts, Neville Sillitoe, Pamela Turney, Physiotherapist - Peter Duras, Masseur - Frederick Warwick ; Badminton Manager - Don Stockins, Coach - Joy Twining ; Lawn Bowls Manager - Edward Singleton, Coach - Clarence Watkins ; Boxing Manager/Trainer - Paul Thompson, Assistant Trainer - Barry Parnell ; Cycling Manager - Ray Godkin, Track Coach - Charlie Walsh, Road Coach - Alexander Fulcher, Mechanic - John Beasley ; Shooting Manager - Peter Anderson, Coach - Tibor Gonczol, Assistant Coach - Donald Jones ; Swimming Manager - Geoffrey Hare, Assistant Managers - Dr Diana Bendeich, Margaret Cain, Head Coach - Terry Buck, Coaches - Joe King, Lawrie Lawrence, John Rodgers, Bill Sweetenham, Ken Wood ; Diving Manager - Col Hanlin, Coach - Peter Panayi ; Weightlifting Manager - Ronald Nylander, Coaches - Paul Coffa, Bruce Walsh ; Wrestling Manager - James Sinclair, Coach - Samuel Parker, Assistant Coach - Raymond Barry

See also
 Australia at the 1980 Summer Olympics
 Australia at the 1984 Summer Olympics

References

External links 
Commonwealth Games Australia Results Database

1982
Commonwealth Games
Nations at the 1982 Commonwealth Games